Woodleaf is an unincorporated community in Unity Township, Rowan County, North Carolina, United States. Woodleaf has a post office with ZIP code 27054.

History
The Mount Vernon site and St. Andrew's Episcopal Church and Cemetery are located near the Woodleaf community and are listed on the National Register of Historic Places.

The Wood Leaf post office was established on September 4, 1855.  The first post master was Daniel Wood.  The post office name was changed to Woodleaf in 1877.

References

Unincorporated communities in Rowan County, North Carolina
Unincorporated communities in North Carolina